Thomas Van der Plaetsen (born 24 December 1990 in Ghent) is a Belgian decathlete. His biggest achievements are winning the gold medal for decathlon at the 2016 European Athletics Championships, winning bronze medal for heptathlon at the 2014 World Indoor Championships, and gold medal for decathlon at the 2013 and 2015 Summer Universiade.

International competitions

Personal bests
Outdoor
100 metres – 11.04 (+0.6 m/s; Götzis 2014)
400 metres – 48.64 (Ostrava 2011)
1500 metres – 4:32.52 (Götzis 2011)
110 metres hurdles – 14.36 (-0.3 m/s; Götzis 2021)
High jump – 2.17 (Daegu 2011)
Pole vault – 5.45 (Talence 2019)
Long jump – 7.90 (+1.1 m/s; Götzis 2021)
Shot put – 14.28 (Parow 2019)
Discus Throw – 48.81 (Deinze 2021)
Javelin Throw – 65.31 (Moscow 2013)
Decathlon – 8430 (Götzis 2021)
Indoor
60 metres – 7.13 (Sopot 2014)
1000 metres – 2:40.50 (Sopot 2014)
60 metres hurdles – 8.06 (Mondeville 2014)
High jump – 2.13 (Ghent 2012)
Pole vault – 5.50 (Ghent 2019)
Long jump – 7.78 (Apeldoorn 2014)
Shot put – 14.32 (Sopot 2014)
Heptathlon – 6259 (Sopot 2014)

Health problems
In October 2014, it became known that during an unannounced doping control test in September 2014, Van der Plaetsen had tested positive for the hormone HCG. On 2 October 2014, Van der Plaetsen revealed that those heightened HCG levels were caused by up to then undiagnosed testicular cancer, for which he was then treated.

References

External links 

 
 
 
 
 
 

1990 births
Living people
Belgian decathletes
Sportspeople from Ghent
World Athletics Championships athletes for Belgium
European Athletics Championships medalists
Athletes (track and field) at the 2016 Summer Olympics
Olympic athletes of Belgium
Universiade medalists in athletics (track and field)
Universiade gold medalists for Belgium
Medalists at the 2013 Summer Universiade
Medalists at the 2015 Summer Universiade
Athletes (track and field) at the 2020 Summer Olympics